The 1953 Czechoslovak presidential election took place on 14 June 1953. It was held due to the death of Klement Gottwald. Prime Minister Antonín Zápotocký was elected the new president.

Voting
Klement Gottwald died on 14 March 1953. At the 14 June election, Zápotocký received all 271 votes in the Parliament. He had already been carrying out most presidential duties since Gottwald's death, as per the Constitution.

References

Presidential
1953
Single-candidate elections
Elections in Communist Czechoslovakia